The Icelandic Women's Volleyball League is an annual competition for women's volleyball clubs in Iceland. It has been held since the 1973/74 season.

History 
6 teams participated in the 2020/21 championship in the top division: Afturelding ( Mosfellsbair ), HK Kópavogur ( Kopavogur ), KA Akureyri ( Akureyri ), Þróttur Neskaupstað ( Neskøypstadur ), Álftanes, Þróttur Reykjavík ( Reykjavik ). The title was won by Afturelding, who won the final series beating HK Kópavogur 2-1 (1: 3, 3: 1, 3: 0). The 3rd place was taken by KA Akureyri.

List of Champions

References

External links 
 Icelandic Volleyball Union 
 Icelandic Volleyball Competition   
  Icelandic League. women.volleybox.net 

Iceland
Volleyball in Iceland
Icelandic Women's League
Sports leagues established in 1974
Sports leagues in Iceland